The 2017 September King Cash Spiel was held from September 14 to 17 at the Golden Ears Winter Club in Maple Ridge, British Columbia as part of the 2017–18 World Curling Tour. Both the men's and women's events were held in a round robin format, and the purses for the men's event was $12,000 and women's event was CAD $8,000

Men

Teams
The teams are listed as follows:

Round Robin Standings
Final Round Robin Standings

Tie Breakers

 Baier 5-1  Usselman
 Tardi 7-1  Baier

Playoffs

Women

Teams
The teams are listed as follows:

Round Robin Standings
Final Round Robin Standings

Playoffs

References

External links

2017 in British Columbia
Curling in British Columbia
2017 in Canadian curling
Maple Ridge, British Columbia
September 2017 sports events in Canada